The World Allround Speed Skating Championships are a series of speed skating events held annually to determine the best allround speed skater of the world. The event is held over two days, with all skaters entering the first three distances (500 m, 3000 m and 1500 m for women; 500 m, 5000 m and 1500 m for men) and the best eight skaters over these distances getting to ride the last event (5000 m for women; 10 000 m for men). The results of the races are converted to points, and the skater with lowest total score wins the championship.

The International Skating Union has organised the World Allround Championships for Men since 1893 (unofficial Championships were held in the years 1889–1892) and the World Allround Championships for Women since 1936 (unofficial Championships were held in the years 1933–1935). Since 1996 the men's and women's World Allround Championships are held at the same time and venue. Since 2020, the men's and women's World Allround Championships are held every even year – at same time and venue as the men's and women's World Sprint Championships.

Overview

History and medal winners

Combined all-time medal count

Kornél Pajor skated for Hungary until he defected in 1949. From then on, the ISU allowed him to participate as an independent skater representing the ISU, as he did winning the bronze medal in 1951.
From 1889 to 1907 only gold medals were awarded: to win the gold medal, an athlete was required to win at least three of the distances. In seven competitions, no winner was declared due to this rule.
Unofficial World Championships (not recognized by the ISU) included

Repeat winners

* unofficial World Championships 

Source: SpeedSkatingStats.com

See also
World Sprint Speed Skating Championships
Speed skating at the Winter Olympics
European Speed Skating Championships

References

External links
International Skating Union (ISU) Statistics

Allround
All-round speed skating